Jiří Kratochvil (born 4 January 1940) is a Czech writer.

In 1991 Tom Stoppard Prize for his book Medvědí román ("A Bear's Novel"). In 1999 he was awarded the Jaroslav Seifert Prize.

Selected works
 Medvědí román (1990; "A Bear's Novel") (Winner of the 1991 Tom Stoppard Prize)
Uprostřed nocí zpěv (1992, 2010)
Avion (1995)
Siamský příběh (1996)
Nesmrtelný příběh (1997)
Noční tango (1999)
Urmedvěd (1999)
 Truchlivý Bůh (2000) ("Mournful God")
Lady Carneval (2004)
Herec (2006)
Slib (2009) ("The Promise")
Femme fatale (2010)
Dobrou noc, sladké sny (2012)
Alfa Centauri (2013)
Jízlivá potměšilost žití (2017)
Je suis Paris (2018)
Liška v dámu (2019)

References

1940 births
Writers from Brno
Czech male writers
Postmodern writers
Living people